Maryville High School may refer to:

Maryville High School (Missouri)
Maryville High School (Ohio)
Maryville High School (Maryland)
Maryville High School (Tennessee)